Articles on Ignition system include:

 Ignition system
 Capacitor discharge ignition
 Delco ignition system
 Hot-tube ignitor
 Inductive discharge ignition
 Outside flame ignitor
 Piezo ignition

See also
 Detonator
 Exploder